Layla bint Abullah ibn Shaddad ibn Ka’b al-Akhyaliyyah (d. c. AH 75/694×90/709 CE), or simply Layla al-Akhyaliyyah was a famous Umayyad Arab poet who was renowned for her poetry, eloquence, strong personality, and beauty. Nearly fifty of her short poems survive. They include elegies for her lover Tawba ibn Humayyir and ‘Uthman ibn ‘Affan; 'lewd satires' exchanged with the poet al-Nabigha al-Ja‘di; and panegyrics for leading Umayyad officials and caliphs: Al-Ḥajjāj ibn Yūsuf, Caliph Marwan I, and Caliph Abd al-Malik ibn Marwan.

Life
She was born to the Banu 'Uqayl section of the Banu 'Amir tribe, coincidentally the same tribe as Qays ibn al-Mullawah and Layla Al-Aamiriya. However, unlike them, she was a city-dweller and not a bedouin.

In her early years, she was known for her love of Tawba ibn Humayyir, but her father refused the marriage, and she married a man called Abi Al-Athla instead. Tawba continued to visit her despite her marriage until her husband complained to the Caliph, who made Tawba leave. Her husband could not bear the jealousy, so he divorced her. She then married an unknown poet and had many children, little is known about them.

Poetry and influence
Her strong personality and fame gave her access to the courts of the Umayyads and others.

She was one of the few early female Arab poets who dared to speak of her love in public; this poetry is particularly associated with Tawba b. al-Ḥumayyir: 'Laylā and Tawba had fallen in love with each other. But when Tawba asked for Laylā's hand in marriage, her father refused, and married Laylā to another man. Later, Tawba was killed, and this inspired the laments of Laylā'. What made this even more daring was that she was married to another (Sawwār b. Awfā al-Qushayrī). Nevertheless love poetry was not her only genre, as her poems were diverse in subjects, although she avoided politics. This helped her to continue her relations with politically influential people, despite changing times and powers. Her work includes exchanges of satires with Nābigha al-Ja‘dī (apparently between 40/660 and 63/683) and Ḥumayda bint Nu‘mān ibn Bashīr.

Her poetry was often compared to that of Al-Khansa. However, Layla had more diverse imagery, not confined to the desert, and used more than one genre, not confining herself to one subject. Her poetry also contained some philosophical aspects and wisdom, usually attributed to her extensive travel. On the other hand, Layla depended highly on her poetry for income where she was awarded with money for some poems, and her poetry provided her with connections to rich and powerful people while Al-Khansa depended on her family’s traditional pastoralism.

She died in 704 near the city of Samawa in Iraq while traveling.

Example of her poetry: 

أحــجاج لا يفـلل سلاحك إنما
المنـايا بكـف الله حيث تراها
إذا هبـط الحجاج أرضاً مريضة
تتبـع أقصـى دائـها فشفـاها
شفاها من الداء العضال الذي بها
غـلام إذا هـز القنـا سقـاها
سقاها دمــاء المارقين وعلـها
إذا جمحت يوماً وخفيـف أذاها
إذا سمـع الحجـاج صوت كتيبة
أعـد لها قبـل النـزول قراها

References

Further reading
Al-Isfahani, Abu al-Faraj. Kitab al-aghani (Book of Songs). 24 vols, in progress. Cairo: Dar al-Kutub al-Misriyya, 1929–present.
The Cambridge History of Arabic Literature: Arabic Literature to the End of the Umayyad Period. Edited by A.F.L. Beeston, T.M. Johnstone, R.B. Serjeant, and G.R. Smith. Cambridge: Cambridge University Press, 1983.
 
Ibn Qutayba. al-Shi'r wa-'l-shu'ara''' (Poetry and Poets''). Beirut: Dar al-Thaqafa, 1964.

Year of birth unknown
8th-century deaths
Arabic-language women poets
Arabic-language poets
Banu Uqayl
Converts to Islam
7th-century women writers
7th-century Arabic poets
Women poets from the Umayyad Caliphate
7th-century Arabs
7th-century people from the Umayyad Caliphate